Indonesia and the United Arab Emirates (UAE) established diplomatic relations in 1976. The diplomatic relations are important because both share the solidarity as Muslim majority countries. Indonesia has an embassy in Abu Dhabi, while the United Arab Emirates has an embassy in Jakarta. Both countries are members of the World Trade Organization (WTO), The Non-Aligned Movement and Organisation of Islamic Cooperation (OIC).

History
Indonesia was one of the nations that immediately recognized the United Arab Emirates upon its independence in 1971. Diplomatic relations has been established since 1976. The former president Suharto visited UAE in October 1977, and a year later the Indonesian embassy in Abu Dhabi was established in 1978. The former president B. J. Habibie, by then a minister, also visited United Arab Emirates in 1988.

The visit of the President of UAE Sheikh Zayed bin Sultan Al Nahyan to Indonesia in May 1990, followed by the establishment of United Arab Emirates embassy in Jakarta on 10 June 1991 further strengthened the relations between two countries.

In May 2006 Indonesian President Susilo Bambang Yudhoyono visited United Arab Emirates and met President of UAE Sheikh Khalifa Bin Zayed Al Nahyan.

Economy and trade
Indonesia sees the United Arab Emirates as a strategic ally as business center of the world, especially in Middle East region. Indonesia uses the UAE as the main gate to enter the Persian Gulf and Middle East market, that is why Indonesia's export to UAE is the largest in the Middle East. Indonesian Government has established the trade and investment representative office to promote its products in United Arab Emirates and the entire Middle East region.

Trade volume between Indonesia and UAE stood at more than US$2.18 billion in 2008. The value of Indonesia's exports to the UAE is exceeding more than US$1 billion, with Indonesia's primary exports to the UAE consisting of more than 200 items, such as textiles, garment, paper, plywood, furniture (Indonesia covers 35% of UAE market) and electronics. While the value of UAE's exports to Indonesia is around US$400 million, consisting of products among others; lubricant oil, chemical products, aluminum ore, iron scraps and corn flour. UAE has announced a plan to invest US$10 billion in Indonesia Investment Authority (INA), this investment will fund infrastructure projects, tourism and agriculture.

The United Arab Emirates is also a popular destinations for Indonesian workers in the Middle East. In 2020 approximately around 36 thousand Indonesian workers work in the UAE.

Indonesia and the United Arab Emirates signed a free trade agreement on July 1, 2022. The agreement will come into force once it is ratified by both countries.

See also 
 Foreign relations of Indonesia
 Foreign relations of the United Arab Emirates

Notes

External links
Embassy of United Arab Emirates in Jakarta, Indonesia

United Arab Emirates
Bilateral relations of the United Arab Emirates